Gennady Fedorovich Tsygurov (14 April 1942 – 14 December 2016) was a Russian professional ice hockey coach and player. He played for Traktor Chelyabinsk from 1959 to 1977 in the Soviet Championship League. From 1979 to 1984, he then served as head coach of Traktor. Tsygurov also served as the coach of SC Uritskogo Kazan, Avangard Omsk, Lada Togliatti. HK MVD Balashikha, Kristall Saratov and Saryarka Karaganda. He was the father of the late professional ice hockey player Denis Tsygurov (1971–2015); another son  also played at a high level.

References

External links

1942 births
2016 deaths
Russian ice hockey coaches
Soviet ice hockey coaches
Soviet ice hockey defencemen
Sportspeople from Chelyabinsk
Traktor Chelyabinsk players
Russian ice hockey defencemen
Russian expatriate ice hockey people
Russian expatriate sportspeople in Kazakhstan